Thomas Howard (died 1682) was elected MP for Haverfordwest Parliament constituency in 1681.

References

English MPs 1681
1682 deaths